Flying Star may refer to:

Flying Star (restaurant), a fast food chain in Albuquerque, USA
Flying Star Feng Shui
Piazzi's Flying Star